Oleg Lebedev (born October 12, 1976, Tula, Russia) is a Russian political figure and a deputy of the 6th, 7th, and 8th State Dumas.
 
From 1996 to 2000, From 1996 to 2000, he worked at various enterprises in Tula as an economist, manager, deputy director. In 1997, Lebedev joined the Communist Party of the Russian Federation. In 2001, he was elected the first secretary of the Tula branch of the party. In 2014, he headed the branch. On October 1, 2000, he was elected deputy of the Tula Oblast Duma. In 2004 and 2009, he was re-elected for the Tula Oblast Duma of the 4th and 5th convocations, respectively. On January 27, 2012, he received a vacant mandate for the 6th State Duma. In 2016 and 2021, he was re-elected for the 7th and 8th State Dumas, respectively.

References
 

 

1976 births
Living people
Communist Party of the Russian Federation members
21st-century Russian politicians
Eighth convocation members of the State Duma (Russian Federation)
Seventh convocation members of the State Duma (Russian Federation)
Sixth convocation members of the State Duma (Russian Federation)
People from Tula, Russia